Mohammadreza Abbasi (born July 27, 1996) is an Iranian footballer winger who plays for Tractor.

Club career

Zob Ahan
Abbasi was part of Zob Ahan Academy since 2010. He was promoted to the first team by Yahya Golmohammadi in summer 2014 with a 3-year contract. He made his debut for Zob Ahan on September 4, 2014 against Saipa as a starter.

Club Career Statistics

Honours

Club
Zob Ahan
Hazfi Cup (2): 2014–15, 2015–16
Iranian Super Cup (1): 2016

Foolad
Hazfi Cup (1): 2020–21
Iranian Super Cup: 2021

References

External links 
 Mohammadreza Abbasi at IranLeague.ir
 Mohammadreza Abbasi at PersianLeague.com

1996 births
Living people
Zob Ahan Esfahan F.C. players
Iranian footballers
People from Hormozgan Province
Iran under-20 international footballers
Association football midfielders
21st-century Iranian people